Tom's d'Etat (foaled  March 7, 2013 in Kentucky) is an American Thoroughbred racehorse and the winner of the 2019 Clark Handicap and 2020 Stephen Foster Stakes.

Career

Tom's d'Etat's first race was on May 6, 2016, at Churchill Downs, where he came in 11th. He picked up his first win on August 5, 2016, at Saratoga.

He spent 2017 and 2018 mostly competing in Allowance Optional Claiming races, picking up 4 wins in 5 races. He fractured his leg during the 2017 season, missing over a year.

On December 22nd, 2018, he competed in and won his first stakes race at the age of 6, the Tenacious Stakes at Fair Grounds Race Course. He was the favorite in the race at 7:10 odds.

6-year-old season 
He started off the 2019 season by competing in the Grade 1 Pegasus World Cup Invitational Stakes, but placed 9th. He did not pick up his first win for the 2019 season until he captured the 2019 Alydar Stakes. He beat Wooderson by a length.

He finished the 2019 season with two wins. He captured the Fayette Stakes on October 26th, beating Mr Freeze by over four lengths in a sloppy race. 
Tom's d'Etat then captured the biggest win of his career on November 29, 2019, by winning the Grade 1 Clark Handicap. He entered the race as a 9:10 favorite and defeated Owendale and Mr Freeze.

7-year-old season 
Tom's d'Etat started off the 2020 season on April 11th when he captured the Oaklawn Mile Stakes, beating multiple Grade 1 winner Improbable by three-quarters of a length on a sloppy track.

He then followed this victory up with a Grade 2 victory in the Stephen Foster Stakes on June 27th, defeating another multiple graded stakes winner By My Standards.

Pedigree

References

2013 racehorse births
American racehorses
Racehorses bred in Kentucky
Racehorses trained in the United States
Thoroughbred family 13-c